Tensor Product refers to one of several related binary operations, typically denoted . Usually, they are associative, unital, and symmetric (up to some appropriate kind of structural equivalence). 

It may refer to:

 Tensor product of vector spaces, an operation on vector spaces (the original tensor product)
Tensor product of modules, the same operation slightly generalized to modules over arbitrary rings
Kronecker product, the tensor product of matrices (or vectors), which satisfies all the properties for vector spaces and allows a concrete representation
Tensor product of Hilbert spaces, endowed with a special inner product as to remain a Hilbert space
Other topological tensor products
 Tensor product of graphs, an operation on graphs, whose adjacency matrices are the Kronecker product of the component adjacency matrices
Tensor product of algebras (or rings), on algebras over a field (or other commutative ring)
Tensor product of representations, a special case in representation theory
Tensor product of fields, an operation on fields—unlike most tensor products, the category of fields is not closed with respect to this operation (i.e., sometimes the product is not a field)
"Categorified" concepts, applied "pointwise" on objects and morphisms:
Tensor product of vector bundles
Tensor product of sheaves of modules, essentially the same thing
Tensor product of functors

Categories closed under a suitable tensor product are called "monoidal categories".  Special types of monoidal categories exist with interesting properties.